Baudin may refer to:

People
 Auguste Baudin (1800–1877), French admiral and colonial governor
 Charles Baudin (1792–1854), French admiral
 Fernand Baudin (1918–2005), Belgian graphic designer
 Eugène Baudin (1853–1918), French ceramist and politician
 François-André Baudin (1774–1842), French admiral
 Jacques Baudin (born 1939), Senegalese politician
 Jean-Baptiste Baudin (1811–1851), French physician, Assembly deputy, and martyr
 Nicolas Baudin (1754–1803), French explorer
 Baudin expedition to Australia, 1800–1803
 Robert Baudin (1918–1983), American counterfeiter

Geography

Antarctica
 Baudin Peaks, Graham Land, Antarctica

Australia

South Australia
 Baudin Beach, South Australia,  a locality
Baudin Conservation Park, a protected area  
Baudin Rocks, an island  
Baudin Rocks Conservation Park, a protected area  
 Electoral district of Baudin, South Australia, in existence from 1977 to 1993
Nicolas Baudin Island, an island  
Nicolas Baudin Island Conservation Park, a protected area 
Hundred of Baudin, a proposed cadastral division on Kangaroo Island

Western Australia
 Baudin, Western Australia, a locality
 Baudin Island (Kimberley coast), off Western Australia
 Baudin Island (Shark Bay), off Western Australia

Ships
 Amiral Baudin-class ironclad
 French ironclad Amiral Baudin, in service 1883–1910